Mỹ Lộc is a rural district of Nam Định province in the Red River Delta region of Vietnam. As of 2003 the district had a population of 68,674. The district covers an area of 73 km2. The district capital lies at Mỹ Lộc.

References

Districts of Nam Định province